Copa de Competencia was a Uruguayan football competition organized by the Uruguayan Football Association (AUF) that which took place between 1900 and 1925. The champion of this tournament qualified to play the Tie Cup (also known as "Copa Chevallier Boutell") against the Argentine champion of Copa de Competencia Jockey Club.

History
The first Copa de Competencia champion was Albion F.C. in 1900, the same year that AUF was established.

From 1900 to 1906 the winner qualified to the semifinals of Tie Cup. In 1907 the rule was modified therefore the winner was allowed to play the final against the Argentine winner, being the matches always played in Buenos Aires. It lasted until 1919. the 1921 and 1923 editions were disputed by Uruguayan teams only.

The most successful team was Nacional which awarded the trophy 8 times.

List of champions

Titles by team

See also
Copa de Competencia Jockey Club
Tie Cup

Notes

References

Football competitions in Uruguay
Recurring sporting events established in 1900
1923 disestablishments in Uruguay
1900 establishments in Uruguay